Colin Povey is the Chief Executive of Warwickshire County Cricket Club. He was formerly Chief Executive of Carlsberg.

He was educated at the Lancaster Royal Grammar School. He captained England at Water Polo and played for and coached the Great Britain side.

References

Living people
English cricket administrators
English male water polo players
Water polo coaches
People educated at Lancaster Royal Grammar School
Secretaries of Warwickshire County Cricket Club
Year of birth missing (living people)